NGC 7314 is a spiral galaxy located in the southern constellation of Piscis Austrinus. It was discovered by English astronomer John Herschel on July 29, 1834. Since it appears to have detached spiral arm segments (either from dust lanes or bright star clusters), it was listed in Halton Arp's Atlas of Peculiar Galaxies.

Walter Scott Houston describes its appearance in small telescopes:
Do not let its photographic magnitude of 11.6 scare you off, for it can be seen in a 6-inch telescope as a curiously fuzzy object.  But it is small, appearing only 4' by 2'.

The morphological classification of this galaxy is SAB(rs)bc, indicating a spiral galaxy with a weak central bar (SAB), an incomplete ring structure around the bar (rs), and moderately–wound arms (bc). The plane of the galactic disk is inclined by 64° to the line of sight from the Earth, with the major axis aligned along a position angle of 178°. Within the galaxy's core is an active galactic nucleus tentatively classified as a type I Seyfert. The core is a source for X-ray emission that is seen to vary dramatically on time scales as low as hours.

References

External links
 
 

Barred spiral galaxies
Seyfert galaxies
Piscis Austrinus
7314
69253
014